This is a list of elected officials serving in the city of Bakersfield, California. They include: city officials (mayor), city council members, California state representatives, and United States federal representatives.

City of Bakersfield

Mayor – Karen Goh

City Council

Ward 1 (Southeast) – Willie Rivera
Ward 2 (Downtown and East Bakersfield) – Andre Gonzales
Ward 3 (Northeast) – Ken Weir
Ward 4 (Northwest) – Bob Smith
Ward 5 (Southwest – Seven Oaks) – Bruce Freeman
Ward 6 (Southwest – Stockdale) – Jacquie Sullivan
Ward 7 (South Bakersfield) – Chris Parlier
Region names are not exact since district (ward) boundaries are based on population.

California State Legislature

Assembly

Senate

United States Congress

House of Representatives

Senate

Senior – Dianne Feinstein
Junior – Alex Padilla

References

Elected Officials of Bakersfield
Government of Bakersfield, California